Tobias Mabuta Munihango (born 1983) is a Namibian amateur boxer.

Munihango finished in third place at the 1st AIBA African 2008 Olympic Qualifying Tournament held in January 2008 in Algeria but did not qualify for Boxing at the 2008 Summer Olympics on a technicality. He competed in the 2nd round of African qualification for the 2008 games, which was held in Windhoek in March 2008, but did not qualify.

References

1983 births
Living people
Boxers at the 2010 Commonwealth Games
Commonwealth Games competitors for Namibia
Super-heavyweight boxers
Namibian male boxers